Dwayne Hay (born February 11, 1977) is a Canadian former professional ice hockey player who played in the National Hockey League (NHL) for the Washington Capitals, Florida Panthers, Tampa Bay Lightning, and Calgary Flames.

Playing career

NHL
Originally selected by the Washington Capitals in the 1995 NHL Entry Draft, Hay played two games with the Capitals before he was traded to the Florida Panthers in exchange for Esa Tikkanen in what turned out to be their run to the finals in 1998.  Hay also played for the Tampa Bay Lightning and Calgary Flames.

Hay compiled 6 points in 79 NHL games.

Minor Leagues
Hay also spent time in the American Hockey League, ECHL, and the Central Hockey League. During his time with the Pensacola Ice Pilots of the ECHL, Hay was named In Glas Co ECHL Player of the Week for the week of December 13–19, 2004.

Hay had initially signed with the Fresno Falcons of the ECHL in July 2007 as a training-camp invite but was eventually released by the team in October. Upon being released by the Falcons, Hay had agreed to play with the Nottingham Panthers of the EIHL. Two days after agreeing to terms, Hay announced that he " would not be in a position to pass a medical on arrival and has been forced to retire from the sport." Despite this, Hay then played with the Bentley Generals of the Chinook Hockey League for the 2007-08 hockey season.

He agreed to play with the Corner Brook Royals during the 2008-09 season. Despite promising to "at least play all home games", Hay was a no-show to several team functions a week prior to the Royals' first home game, and decided to play with the then-Swedish Division 1 team Örebro HK

Hay signed with the Arizona Sundogs of the Central Hockey League on January 28, 2009.

Hay most recently played with HC Alleghe of Serie A, a top tier ice hockey league in Italy.

Career statistics

Regular season and playoffs

Personal
Hay currently lives in Calgary and runs the DH One Speed Athletics Hockey School and Bootcamps.

References

External links

1977 births
Calgary Flames players
Canadian ice hockey left wingers
Florida Panthers players
Guelph Storm players
Ice hockey people from Ontario
Living people
Rio Grande Valley Killer Bees players
Sportspeople from London, Ontario
Tampa Bay Lightning players
Washington Capitals draft picks
Washington Capitals players
Player-coaches